The Prospect Heights Housing Project is a historic public housing complex at 560 Prospect Street in Pawtucket, Rhode Island. The complex was developed in 1941–42, with funding assistance from the United States Housing Authority, a New Deal-era housing initiative of the federal government. It is the one of two complexes of this type in the city, and has only seen relatively minor alterations.

The complex was listed on the National Register of Historic Places in 2015.

See also

National Register of Historic Places listings in Pawtucket, Rhode Island

References

Historic districts in Providence County, Rhode Island
Pawtucket, Rhode Island
Historic districts on the National Register of Historic Places in Rhode Island
National Register of Historic Places in Pawtucket, Rhode Island